P/2010 B2 (today 412P/WISE) is a periodic comet in the Solar System. It is the first comet discovered by the space observatory WISE and was first observed on January 22, 2010 and has since been followed by ground observatories, among them the Mauna Kea Observatory.

The comet has an orbital period of 4.7 years, an aphelion of 4 astronomical units and a perihelion of 1.6 astronomical units.

References 

Periodic comets